Dhudhuroa is an extinct Australian Aboriginal language of north-eastern Victoria. As it is no longer spoken, Dhudhuroa is primarily known today from written material collected by R. H. Mathews from Neddy Wheeler. It has gone by numerous names, including Dhudhuroa, the Victorian Alpine language, Dyinningmiddhang, Djilamatang, Theddora, Theddoramittung, Balangamida, and Tharamirttong. Yaitmathang (Jaitmathang), or Jandangara (Gundanora), was spoken in the same area, but was a dialect of Ngarigu.

Dhudhuroa language is currently undergoing a revival, and is being taught at Bright Secondary College and Wooragee Primary School.

Phonology

Consonants

Vowels 

Blake and Reid (2002) suggest that there were possibly two retroflex consonants.

References

Sources

Further reading 
 Bibliography of Dhuduroa people and language resources, at the Australian Institute of Aboriginal and Torres Strait Islander Studies

Gippsland languages
Extinct languages of Victoria (Australia)